Andrew Conru is an American internet businessman who has founded e-commerce, advertising, online dating, and personal ad sites including W3, AdKnowledge, WebPersonals, FriendFinder, and Adult FriendFinder. He is the CEO of FriendFinder Networks Inc.

Education and early career

Conru grew up in northwestern Indiana and attended Rose-Hulman Institute of Technology, earning undergraduate degrees in economics and chemical engineering. In 1991, he went to Stanford, receiving a doctorate in mechanical engineering.

While there, he founded W3.com, an early interactive website development firm that was the first company to develop commercial software for membership management. The company created PWS (Personal Web Site), an early customized advertising product used by Hewlett-Packard and Egghead Software. In 1997, the company released a product called AdOptimizer Network, the first centralized ad server, which allowed sites to manage advertising across a network of sites. He also founded Adknowledge, a web-based banner advertising company. In 1994, Conru founded WebPersonals.com. Considered to be one of the first internet dating sites, Conru sold the company in 1995.

FriendFinder

In 1996, he launched FriendFinder.com, an early social networking site. Days after the site went live, Conru found that members were posting nude photos pictures of themselves and using the site to seek out partners for adult activities. As a result, Conru started Adult FriendFinder, followed by other niche dating sites, including Senior FriendFinder, Amigos.com, BigChurch.com, and Alt.com. By 2007, the combined websites had 260 million registered members, more than 500,000 affiliates and 450 employees.

In December 2007, Conru sold the company to Penthouse Media Group for $500 million, much of which came in the form of IOUs. Penthouse later changed its name to FriendFinder Networks. On September 17, 2013, FriendFinder Networks Inc. filed for Chapter 11 bankruptcy protection. In December 2013, as the company emerged from bankruptcy protection, Conru once again gained control of the company, where he now serves as CEO.

Compute.org

In 2010, Conru launched the non-profit foundation Compute.org, which awards internet and software startups with grants in amounts of $50,000100,000. One startup that has been awarded is CityRoof.org, a social network for homeless people that helps the homeless connect with necessary resources.

In 2014, he delivered the keynote address at AVN Internext Expo in Las Vegas, Nevada.

See also
 Locals

References

External links
Official website

People from Indiana
American Internet company founders
Living people
Stanford University School of Engineering alumni
Rose–Hulman Institute of Technology alumni
American technology chief executives
Year of birth missing (living people)